Pictilabrus is a genus of wrasses endemic to the eastern Indian Ocean waters of Australia first discovered in 1940.

Species
The currently recognized species in this genus are:
 Pictilabrus brauni Hutchins & S. M. Morrison, 1996 (Braun's wrasse)
 Pictilabrus laticlavius (J. Richardson, 1840) (patrician wrasse)
 Pictilabrus viridis B. C. Russell, 1988 (false senator wrasse)

References

Labridae
Marine fish genera
Taxa named by Theodore Gill